The Émile Guimet Prize for Asian Literature (Le Prix Émile Guimet de littérature asiatique) is a French literary prize awarded for the first time in 2017, and annually thereafter.

About the prize 
The jury is made up of staff from the Musée Guimet, with writers, publishers and others in the book world. Between five and ten works from the previous year are selected on the basis of four criteria
 the winning work is a translation into French,
 the author is from one of the geographical areas of expertise of the museum,
 the translation was published in France during the previous calendar year,
 the original text was published in its country of origin less than ten years earlier.

Winners and honorees

References

External links
 The Émile Guimet Prize on the Musée Guimet website

French literary awards
Translation awards
Awards established in 2017
2017 establishments in France